Chincholi Assembly constituency is one of the 224 assembly constituencies of Karnataka, a southern state of India. This constituency falls under Bidar Lok Sabha constituency.

Members of Vidhan Sabha

Hyderabad State
 1951: G. Ramachari, Indian National Congress

Mysore State
 1957: Veerendra Patil, Indian National Congress
 1962: Veerendra Patil, Indian National Congress
 1967: V. P. Basappa, Indian National Congress
 1972: Devendrappa Ghalappa Jamadar, Indian National Congress

Karnataka State
 1978: Devendrappa Ghalappa Jamadar, Indian National Congress (Indira)
 1983: Devendrappa Ghalappa Jamadar, Indian National Congress
 1985: Veerayya Swami Mahalingayya, Indian National Congress
 1989: Veerendra Patil, Indian National Congress
 1994: Vaijanath Patil, Janata Dal
 1999: Kailashnath Patil, Indian National Congress
 2004: Vaijanath Patil, Janata Dal (S)
 2008: Sunil Vallyapure, Bharatiya Janata Party (BJP)
 2013: Umesh. G. Jadhav, Indian National Congress
 2018: Umesh. G. Jadhav, Indian National Congress      Umesh Jadhav left Congress in 2019, joined BJP, and was elected to Lok Sabha in 2019 elections.

Election Results

2019 Bypoll

See also
 Bidar (Lok Sabha constituency)
 Kalaburagi district

References

Assembly constituencies of Karnataka
Kalaburagi district